Grasleben is a municipality in the district of Helmstedt, in Lower Saxony, Germany. It is situated approximately 10 km north of Helmstedt, and 20 km southeast of Wolfsburg. The Municipality Grasleben includes the villages of Grasleben and Heidwinkel.

Grasleben is also the seat of the Samtgemeinde ("collective municipality") Grasleben.

References

Helmstedt (district)